Steve Bastoni (born 4 March 1966) is an Italian-born Australian actor. He became a household name in Australia for his role as Constable Yannis 'Angel' Angelopoulos in Police Rescue  and as Steve Parker in Neighbours. His memorable performance in 15 Amore garnered him a nomination for the AACTA Award for Best Actor in a Leading Role.

Over three decades he has amassed an impressive body of work including credits in The Matrix Reloaded, Blue Murder, Wentworth, Broke, Hawaii Five-0, The Water Diviner, PokerFace and many more. His theatre credits include his “tour de force” performance in Arthur Miller's View from the Bridge for Melbourne Theatre Company (Green Room Best Actor Nomination),  Three Penny Opera for Belvoir St, Oliver for Sir Cameron Mackintosh and Ben Elton's Popcorn (Green Room Best Actor Nomination).

Career

Television
His major roles have been in Police Rescue from 1991 until 1996, and in Neighbours from 2007 until 2009.  He has also appeared in many other Australian series such as Wildside (1998), Prisoner (1986), On the Beach (2000) and Stingers (1999–2002). Bastoni hosted Missing Persons Unit (replacing Mike Munro) in 2009 and 2010. He appeared in Underbelly: The Golden Mile in 2010 as Louis Bayeh. Steve appeared once in Sea Patrol (2010); He was temporarily replacing Mike Flynn as the Commanding Officer aboard the fictional RAN vessel HMAS Hammersley. He played Don Kaplan in the Australian prison drama Wentworth. Bastoni also played the Homicide Detective, Charlie Bezzina in the 2014 spin off show Fat Tony & Co. to the well known Underbelly which was based on the Melbourne gangland war (1980–2007).

Stage
Theatre work includes the role of 'Rocky' in the 1987 Australian national tour of The Rocky Horror Show starring Daniel Abineri. Abineri also gave him the role of Charlie Fortune in his controversial rock musical Bad Boy Johnny and the Prophets of Doom in 1989. He starred in the high budget stage production Oliver! the musical in Sydney and Melbourne in the role of Bill Sikes alongside John Waters and Tamsin Caroll.

Personal life
Bastoni was previously involved in a relationship with actress Melissa George. He later was in a long-term relationship with TV Star Nina Zandnia. He is married to Bianca Pirrotta and the couple have three children.

Filmography

Film

Television

References

External links

1966 births
Australian male film actors
Australian male musical theatre actors
Australian male soap opera actors
Italian emigrants to Australia
Living people
Male actors from Rome
20th-century Australian male actors
21st-century Australian male actors
People of Lazian descent